The Dévastation-class ironclad floating batteries were built for the attack of Russian coastal fortifications during the Crimean War. France had intended to build ten of these vessels, but in the time available was only able to construct five in French shipyards, of which the first three took part in the attack on Kinburn in 1855, and served in the Adriatic in June–July 1859 during the Italian war.

Operational history
Dévastation left Cherbourg for the Black Sea towed by the paddle-frigate l'Albatros on 10 August 1855. On 17 October 1855 she took part in the bombardment of the Russian fortress at Kinburn, firing 1,265 projectiles (including 82 shells) in four hours, and sustained 72 hits (including 31 on the armour), resulting in 2 of the crew being killed and 12 wounded. In June and July 1859 she was part of the siege flotilla in the Adriatic during the Italian war.
 Tonnante was armed at Rochefort on 2 June 1855. She left Brest for the Black Sea towed by the paddle-frigate Darien. On 17 October 1855 she took part in the bombardment of the Russian fortress at Kinburn, firing 1,012 projectiles in four hours, and sustained 66 hits on her armour, and nine of her crew were wounded.  She spent the winter of 1855–1856 iced in on the Dnieper. She was rearmed on 5 June 1856, and commissioned at Brest on 5 July 1856.  She went into reserve at Brest on 18 September 1857. She was recommissioned at Brest on 3 June 1859, and in June and July 1859 she was part of the siege flotilla in the Adriatic during the Italian war.  She went into reserve on 6 March 1860.
Lave was armed at Lorient on 18 May 1855, and left Lorient for the Black Sea towed by the paddle-frigate Magellan.  On 17 October 1855 she took part in the bombardment of the Russian fortress at Kinburn, firing 900 projectiles in four hours, and received no injuries.  She was disarmed at Toulon on 10 July 1856.  She was rearmed at Toulon on 22 April 1859, and in June and July 1859 she was part of the siege flotilla in the Adriatic during the Italian war. She was disarmed again at Toulon on 1 September 1859.  She was rearmed on 26 October 1867 and disarmed 3 December 1867 at Toulon.  She was again rearmed on 1 September 1870, until she was disarmed at Toulon on 1 April 1871.
Foudroyante was ordered to the Baltic in 1856, but the peace intervened, so she remained at Cherbourg.  She was armed on 10 June 1859, and disarmed in 1865–1867.
 Congrève was armed for war in 1855, and it was planned to send Congrève to the Baltic, but she did not go. She was in reserve in 1861–1865, and disarmed in 1866. 

Congrève was retired in 1867 and the other four in 1871.

Ships in class

In total, the five Dévastation-class ironclad floating batteries cost 6,580,000 Francs (an average of 1,316,000 Francs each).  Dévastation cost 1,146,489 Francs.

References

Bibliography

External links
 Dossiers Marine, la Flotte de Napoléon III, Batteries flottantes, by Alain Clouet.
 Brett Manuscript History Description of the Devastation floating battery from T. B. Brett - 1855

Ironclad floating batteries
 
Ironclad warships of the French Navy